Gloiopeltis is a genus of red algae belonging to the family Endocladiaceae.

The species of this genus are found in Northern America and Eastern Asia.

Species:

Gloiopeltis complanata 
Gloiopeltis furcata 
Gloiopeltis tenax

References

Gigartinales
Red algae genera